Le Cavalier blanc is a Lucky Luke comic written by Goscinny and Morris. English translations of this French comic titled The Dashing White Cowboy have been published by Dargaud and Cinebook.

Plot
Lucky encounters a wandering theater troupe, whose specialty play is the titular drama, The Dashing White Cowboy. But in each town where they perform, a major robbery takes place right during the climactic end scene. His suspicions aroused, Lucky Luke decides to keep a sharp eye on the group, but in the course of his investigation nearly ends up being framed as the culprit twice. Only with the help of a repentant member of the troupe, Gladys, can he bring the culprits to justice.

Characters 

 Whittaker Baltimore: Actor and director who travels the United States with his troupe. He plays the main role of the play. The character has the features of actor John Barrymore.
 Gladys Whimple: Formerly a saloon dancer, she plays Linda, the young first of the play .
 Barnaby Float: Actor specialized in the roles of villains. In the play, he plays Mortimer.
 Francis Lusty: Machinist and Room Driver of the Whittaker Baltimore Troupe.
 Hank: Lucky Luke's old friend.

References

 Morris publications in Spirou BDoubliées

External links
 Lucky Luke official site album index 
 Goscinny website on Lucky Luke

Comics by Morris (cartoonist)
Lucky Luke albums
1975 graphic novels
Works by René Goscinny